Ivar Saris (born 14 July 1993) is a Dutch professional pool player. Saris is a regular player on the Euro Tour, finishing as runner-up at the 2019 Treviso Open, where he lost to Konrad Juszczyszyn in the final 9–6.

Saris made his first appearance at a world championship at the youth WPA World Nine-ball Championship, where he won three matches before losing to Marcel Fortunski. Saris is a three time medalist at the youth European Pool Championships, winning the ten-ball event, and runner-up in straight pool in 2008.

References

External links

Dutch pool players
1993 births
Living people